This article is a list of every street in municipality (corresponding within Center of Athens) of Athens, Greece:

 Red background Includes parts that are not within the municipality of Athens

References

 
Athens
Streets
Athens